Farkas Litkey (born 5 March 1966) is a Hungarian former sailor. He competed in the Finn event at the 1996 Summer Olympics.

References

External links
 

1966 births
Living people
Hungarian male sailors (sport)
Olympic sailors of Hungary
Sailors at the 1996 Summer Olympics – Finn
People from Balmazújváros
Sportspeople from Hajdú-Bihar County